Nils Olof Mård (born 31 January 1989) is a Swedish footballer who was footballer for Sandvikens IF as a defender.

References

External links

Olof Mård at Fotbolltransfers.com

1989 births
Living people
Association football forwards
Sandvikens IF players
Gefle IF players
Allsvenskan players
Ettan Fotboll players
Swedish footballers